Usayd ibn Hudayr al-Awsi (also Usaid ibn Hudair) was a companion of the Islamic prophet Muhammad and a leader of the Banū Aws tribe in the city of Medina before his conversion to Islam. He inherited his leadership position from his father who was a fierce fighter, and one of the senior Arab noblemen in Jahiliyyah.

Descent 

Usayd son of Hudayr, son of Simak, son of Atik, son of Umru' al-Qays, son of Zayd, son of Abd al-Ashhal, son of Jashm, son of Harith, son of al-Khazraj, son Amr, son of Malik, son of Aws, son of Haritha, son of Tha'laba, son of Amr, son of Amir, son of Haritha, son of Tha'laba, son of Ghassan, son of al-Azd, son of al-Ghawth, son of Nabt, son of Malik, Son of Zayd, son of Kahlan, son of Saba, son of Yashjab, son of Ya'rob, son of Qahtan, al-Ashhali al-Awsi.

According to Tabari, Usayd ibn Hudayr were known from his pre-Islamic life as noble who excels at swimming and archery, while he also known as al-Kamil (The perfect one)

Conversion to Islam 
Muhammad had sent Mus'ab ibn Umayr to Medina to teach and educate Muslims of the Ansar (those Medina residents who supported Mohammad) and to invite others to the religion of Allah. Sa'd ibn Mu'adh who was a friend of Usayd learned of this plan and wanted to incite him against Mus'ab. Sa'd asked Usayd to go to Mus'ab and drive him away. Usayd went to Mus'ab, who was hosted by of As'ad ibn Zurara, of the city leaders predating the calling of Islam. At As'ad's place Usayd ran into a crowd of people listening with attention to Mus'ab's call to Islam. Mus'ab invited Usayd to sit and listen before acting, then Mus'ab recited to Quran. Usayd was moved by what he heard and inquired how to join the new religion, he followed Mus'ab's instructions and declared his Islam.

Usayd died in the month of Sha'ban in the 20th year of the Hijra. His casket was carried by Umar ibn al-Khattab and he was buried in Al-Baqi Cemetery.

References 

Burials at Jannat al-Baqī
Year of birth unknown
640 deaths
Azd